Lieutenant General Louis Watson Truman (June 20, 1908 – December 2, 2004) was a senior United States Army officer. He served as Commanding General of the Third United States Army. Truman's father, Major General Ralph E. Truman, was a cousin of President Harry S. Truman, and he served as his Aide-de-Camp during Truman's inauguration in 1948.

Military service
In 1926, Truman enlisted in Company E, 140th Infantry Regiment of the 35th Division. In July 1928, he entered the United States Military Academy at West Point. Upon graduation in June 1932, he was commissioned an infantry second lieutenant.

Truman's first duty assignment was the 6th Infantry Regiment at Jefferson Barracks, Missouri. In 1936, Truman was assigned to Fort Benning, Georgia, where he completed the Infantry School and the Tank School. Next, he served a two-year tour of duty at Fort Davis, in the Canal Zone and then returned to Fort Benning in September 1940 to be a staff and logistics officer in the 2nd Armored Division's 14th Armored Brigade. The 2nd Armored Division at the time was commanded by one of the army's fastest rising officers: Brigadier General George S. Patton, Jr.

In January 1941, Truman was transferred to Pearl Harbor, Hawaii, where he was an Aide-de-Camp to Lieutenant General Walter C. Short, Commanding General of the Hawaiian Department. He was an eyewitness when the Japanese launched their attack on December 7, 1941. He would continue to serve there until February 1942.

In March 1942, Truman was promoted to major and was assigned to United States Army Ground Forces Command headquarters, first as an assistant G3/Operations officer and later as Secretary of the General Staff for Lieutenant General Lesley J. McNair. In April 1944, now a lieutenant colonel, he joined the 84th Infantry Division at Camp Claiborne, Louisiana, where he served as both Division Chief of Staff and later as Assistant Division Commander with the 84th Infantry for the duration of World War II.

In early November 1944, now a colonel with only twelve years commissioned service, Truman landed on Omaha Beach with the 84th Division in Normandy unopposed. He saw combat in the European Theater along the Siegfried Line, the Bulge, the Ardennes and in Germany from the Roer to the Elbe Rivers.

In January 1946, Truman was assigned to Headquarters, United States Forces European Theater, Frankfurt, Germany, as Deputy Theater Chief for Special Services. From 1946 to 1948, he was assigned as Secretary, United States Delegation, United Nations Military Staff Committee. Truman was a student at the National War College from 1948 to 1949. After his graduation from the War College, Truman was a member of the Joint Strategic Planning Group, Office of the Joint Chiefs of Staff at the Pentagon.

Two years after the start of the Korean War, Truman commanded the 223rd Infantry Regiment of the 40th Infantry Division from July 1952 to January 1953. He saw combat first-hand and later served as Assistant Division Commander of the 2nd Infantry Division until the end of hostilities in July 1953. Later that year, he was promoted to the rank of brigadier general and for the next two years, he served as Chief of Staff to Third Army at Fort McPherson, Georgia.

In 1955, Truman was transferred to Naples, Italy, where he was Deputy Chief of Staff – G3/Plans and Operations Officer for NATO's Southern European Command. Truman received a promotion to major general in 1956, and with it the Chairmanship of the Military Assistance Advisory Group, Karachi, Pakistan. Truman later returned to the United States to take command of the 4th Infantry Division at Fort Lewis, Washington, from 1958 until 1960. Subsequently, he was assigned as Deputy Chief of Staff Operations and Training and later as Deputy Commanding General of the United States Continental Army Command at Fort Monroe, Virginia from 1960 to 1962. In that same capacity, Truman also commanded Joint Task Force-Four.

In 1962, President John F. Kennedy nominated Truman for promotion to lieutenant general and, from 1963 until 1965, he commanded the VII Corps at Kelley Barracks, Stuttgart, Germany. His final assignment was his selection by the army's senior leadership to be the Commanding General of the Third United States Army, at Fort McPherson. Truman commanded the Third Army for two years until his retirement on August 1, 1967.

Awards
During his military career, Truman was awarded the Army Distinguished Service Medal, two Silver Stars, two Legions of Merit, three Bronze Star Medals (one with "V" device), two Army Commendation Medals, and the Combat Infantryman Badge with one star. He also wore the American Defense Service Medal, American Campaign Medal, the Asiatic-Pacific Campaign Medal, the European-African-Middle Eastern Campaign Medal, the World War II Victory Medal, The Army of Occupation Medal (Germany), two National Defense Service Medals, Korean Service Medal and UN Service Medal.

  Army Distinguished Service Medal
  Silver Star with one oak leaf cluster
  Legion of Merit with one oak leaf cluster
  Bronze Star with two oak leaf clusters and Valor Device
  Army Commendation Medal with one oak leaf cluster
  American Defense Service Medal
  American Campaign Medal
  European-African-Middle Eastern Campaign Medal
  Asiatic-Pacific Campaign Medal
  World War II Victory Medal
  Army of Occupation Medal with Germany Clasp
  National Defense Service Medal with bronze star
  Korean Service Medal
  United Nations Service Medal

Along with his army awards, Truman received several foreign decorations; the Legion of Honor and Croix de Guerre from France, the Order of Leopold and Croix de Guerre from Belgium, the Order of Orange Nassau from the Netherlands, and the Presidential Unit Citation from the Republic of Korea.

Truman also received many civilian honors. Among them were a Doctorate of Laws degree from Drury College in Springfield, Missouri, a proclamation of July 27, 1967 as "Lt. Gen. Louis W. Truman Day" by former Atlanta Mayor Ivan Allen, Jr. in December 1975 and another proclamation from the Georgia Chamber of Commerce.  He was also the third recipient of the "Good Neighbor Award" from the Harry S. Truman Foundation in 1975.  Recently, Truman was honored by the West Point Society of Atlanta with its "Distinguished Graduate Award."

Retirement
After his retirement from the army, Truman served as Commissioner of the Georgia Department of Industry and Trade under Georgia Governors Lester Maddox, Jimmy Carter, and George Busbee. From 1976 until 1984, Truman was vice president and special assistant to the president of Adams/Cates Realty in Atlanta.

Truman resided in Atlanta after his retirement in 1967. Born June 20, 1908 in Kansas City, Missouri, he was preceded in death by his father, Major General Ralph E. Truman, his mother, Nanny Louise Watson Truman, his brother Colonel Corbie Truman, his sister, Henrietta Truman Davidson, and his first wife, Margret Stevenson Truman.

After his death, Truman was interred at the West Point Cemetery on May 31, 2005.

References

Third Army Public Affairs Office provided permission to release article

External links
Portrait of Louis W. Truman

1908 births
2004 deaths
United States Army generals
United States Army personnel of World War II
United States Army personnel of the Korean War
Recipients of the Distinguished Service Medal (US Army)
Recipients of the Silver Star
Recipients of the Legion of Merit
Chevaliers of the Légion d'honneur
Recipients of the Croix de guerre (Belgium)
Recipients of the Croix de Guerre 1939–1945 (France)
United States Military Academy alumni
National War College alumni
Truman family
People from Kansas City, Missouri
Burials at West Point Cemetery